The Dementia Process is the debut EP by the French deathcore band Eradikal Insane. It was self-released on April 16, 2011 in digipack edition and limited to 1000 copies.

Track 1 feature vocals by François of Digital Nova

Track listing
 "Depths Of Conflict" – 5:37  
 "The Dementia Process" – 3:27  
 "God Bless You" – 3:51  
 "Deathcore United" – 4:46  
 "The Abyss From Below" – 5:23

Band members
Flo - lead guitar, backing vocals
Nico - guitar
R. - drums
J.Trom - lead vocals
Math - bass

References

External links
Official website
Myspace

2011 EPs